Frederick Thomas Dawson (April 26, 1884 – August 18, 1965) was an American football, basketball, and baseball coach.  He served as the head football coach at Union College in Schenectady, New York (1912–1916), Columbia University (1918–1919), the University of Nebraska (1921–1924), the University of Denver (1925–1928), and the University of Virginia (1931–1933).  Dawson also coached the basketball team at Columbia during the 1918–19 season and baseball at Princeton University in 1918 and at Columbia in 1919.

Early life
Dawson was born to Sylvester and Elizabeth Peers Dawson, the 11th of 12 children.  Dawson was a 1910 graduate of Princeton University.

Later life
Health problems eventually forced Dawson to leave the coaching field.  After retiring from coaching, he became an industrial psychologist and a well known public speaker.  Dawson died on August 18, 1965 at a hospital in Omaha, Nebraska.

Head coaching record

Football

References

1884 births
1965 deaths
American men's basketball coaches
Columbia Lions baseball coaches
Columbia Lions football coaches
Columbia Lions men's basketball coaches
Denver Pioneers football coaches
Nebraska Cornhuskers football coaches
Nebraska Cornhuskers athletic directors
Princeton Tigers baseball coaches
Princeton Tigers baseball players
Princeton Tigers football coaches
Princeton Tigers football players
Union Dutchmen basketball coaches
Union Dutchmen football coaches
Virginia Cavaliers football coaches
People from Warren, Massachusetts
Sportspeople from Worcester County, Massachusetts
Basketball coaches from Massachusetts
Baseball coaches from Massachusetts
Coaches of American football from Massachusetts